Awa Fall Diop (born 21 June 1991) is a Senegalese handball player for ATH Achenheim and the Senegalese national team.

She competed at the 2019 World Women's Handball Championship in Japan.

References

1991 births
Living people
Senegalese female handball players
Sportspeople from Strasbourg
French sportspeople of Senegalese descent
French female handball players